Wolfgang Hunger (born 19 July 1960) is a German sailor. He competed at the 1984 Summer Olympics, the 1988 Summer Olympics, and the 1992 Summer Olympics.

References

External links
 
 

1960 births
Living people
German male sailors (sport)
Olympic sailors of West Germany
Olympic sailors of Germany
Sailors at the 1984 Summer Olympics – 470
Sailors at the 1988 Summer Olympics – 470
Sailors at the 1992 Summer Olympics – 470
Sportspeople from Kiel